Panasonic TR-005 Orbitel (also known as the "Flying Saucer" or "The Eyeball" due to its shape) was a television set that was manufactured from the late 1960s to early 1970s by Panasonic. It had a five-inch screen, earphone jack, and could rotate 180 degrees on its chrome tripod.

References

Television sets
Panasonic products